The Self-portrait is a self-portrait painted by the artist Jacques-Louis David in 1794 whilst in prison at the hôtel des fermes for having supported the robespierristes. It was his third and last self-portrait - the second was the 1791 Aux trois collets (Uffizi, Florence). He gave it to his former student Jean-Baptiste Isabey and it then entered the collections of the Louvre in 1852 (inv. 3705).

Descriptio 
The painting represents the artist facing himself, the bust in three-quarters, on a yellow-gray background. He is dressed in a dark overcoat with wide chestnut lapels and a white shirt, tied with a scarf of the same color. In his left hand he holds a brush, in the right a palette. He is seated on an armchair, the back of which can be seen. The figure is illuminated from the right. Because the portrait was painted from a mirror image, the positions of the hands are reversed; David does not correct this detail, which shows him holding the paintbrush in his left hand, although he is right-handed; similarly, the tumor that affects his left cheek is found on the right but is hidden in shadow.

David represented himself as a young man, which he is no longer since he was 46 when he painted this painting.

References

1794 paintings
Paintings in the Louvre by French artists
Portrait paintings in the Louvre
Portraits by Jacques-Louis David
David, Jacques-Louis